Jan Brockhoff (born 3 December 1994 in Hildesheim) is a German former cyclist, who rode professionally between 2013 and 2018 for the , ,  and the  teams. He now works as a directeur sportif for UCI Continental team .

Major results

2012
 1st  Road race, National Junior Road Championships
2014
 1st Stage 5 Tour Alsace
2015
 4th Overall Carpathian Couriers Race
1st Prologue
 6th Liège–Bastogne–Liège U23
 8th Vuelta a La Rioja
2016
 9th Overall Tour de Normandie
2017
 7th Grand Prix Criquielion
 7th Grand Prix de la ville de Nogent-sur-Oise
 8th Antwerpse Havenpijl
 10th Overall Le Triptyque des Monts et Châteaux

References

External links

1994 births
Living people
German male cyclists
Sportspeople from Hildesheim
Directeur sportifs
Cyclists from Lower Saxony